"Dígale" is the first single from AK-7 second album Renaciendo. The song was originally by David Bisbal from his album Corazón Latino.

Video

References

External links
 "Dígale" official Video

AK-7 songs
2008 songs